The Diadem of the Czarina is a 1922 German silent historical film directed by Richard Löwenbein and starring Eduard von Winterstein, Dora Bergner, and Carl Auen.

Cast

References

Bibliography

External links

1922 films
Films of the Weimar Republic
Films directed by Richard Löwenbein
German silent feature films
German black-and-white films
1920s historical films
German historical films
1920s German films